TerreStar-1 is an American communications satellite which was operated by TerreStar Corporation. It was constructed by Space Systems/Loral, based on the LS-1300S bus, and carries E/F band (IEEE S band) transponders which will be used to provide mobile communications to North America. The signals are transmitted by an  reflector on the satellite.

TerreStar was launched at 17:52 GMT on July 1, 2009, during a two-hour launch window that opened at 16:13. The launch occurred towards the end of the window due to bad weather in the first hour, followed by two aborted countdowns for launch attempts scheduled at 17:12 and 17:34. The launch was conducted by Arianespace, and used an Ariane 5ECA carrier rocket, flying from ELA-3 at the Guiana Space Centre. After launch, the satellite separated from the carrier rocket into a geosynchronous transfer orbit. It will subsequently raise itself into geostationary orbit by means of its onboard propulsion system. It will be positioned at 111° West longitude, and is expected to operate for 15 years. A second satellite, TerreStar-2 (now EchoStar XXI), is currently under construction and will be used as a ground spare per the Federal Communications Commission guidelines.

Following TerreStar's filing for Chapter 11 bankruptcy, a movement had been formed by the NGO A Human Right to purchase TerreStar-1 and to use it to provide free basic Internet access to developing countries. The team was looking for US$150,000 in donations to put the first phase of their plan into action. However, after successfully bidding $1.375 billion for the acquisition of the TerreStar-1 satellite in a bankruptcy-court auction Dish Network on August 22, 2011 asked the Federal Communications Commission to let the company use the wireless spectrum of TerreStar to offer its own wireless broadband service.

References

External links

TerreStar Corporation 
TerreStar Networks
NSSDC SPACEWARN Bulletin - TerreStar 1 - 2009-035A
Buy This Satellite Project
A Human Right

Spacecraft launched in 2009
Communications satellites in geostationary orbit